Tczów  is a village in Zwoleń County, Masovian Voivodeship, in east-central Poland. It is the seat of the gmina (administrative district) called Gmina Tczów.

The village has a population of 620.

References

Villages in Zwoleń County